Ontario is a province of Canada that has established several official emblems and symbols to reflect the province's history, natural resources, and its people. In addition to official symbols, several other emblems and symbols exist that are commonly associated with the province.

Official symbols
Several emblems and symbols are used to officially represent the province, established through royal warrant or through the Legislative Assembly of Ontario. They include:

Other symbols
Several emblems and symbols exist that are commonly associated with province. They include:

Symbols of the Lieutenant Governor of Ontario
There exists several official emblems and symbols to represent the Lieutenant Governor of Ontario.

References

Ontario
Symbols
Canadian provincial and territorial symbols